Matheus Galdezani (born 13 March 1992) is a Brazilian footballer who plays as defensive midfielder for Ferroviária.

Club career
Galdezani was born in Limeira, São Paulo, and finished his formation with Desportivo Brasil. He made his first team debut on 29 May 2010, coming on as a second-half substitute in a 3–2 Campeonato Paulista Segunda Divisão away win against SEV Hortolândia.

Galdezani moved to Paulista in 2012; initially assigned to the youth setup, he started to feature for the senior squad in the 2012 Copa Paulista. Definitely promoted to the first team ahead of the 2013 Campeonato Paulista, he scored his first goal on 21 March of that year by netting the equalizer in a 2–1 away win against Guarani.

On 3 April 2014, Galdezani was presented at Juventude, featuring regularly during the year's Série C. On 27 October, he joined Rio Claro.

After impressing with Rio Claro, Galdezani signed for Série A side Sport on 18 June 2015. He made his debut in the category on 18 October, coming on as a second-half substitute for Ronaldo in a 4–1 home routing of Atlético Mineiro; it was his maiden appearance for the club.

On 8 January 2016, Galdezani agreed to a contract with CRB in the Série B. An undisputed starter, he featured in 34 league matches and scored four goals as his side finished five points away from promotion.

On 22 December 2016, Galdezani signed a one-year contract with Coritiba in the top tier. He scored his first goal in the first division the following 8 June, netting the game's only in a home success over Palmeiras.

On 16 June 2017, after being regularly used, Galdezani was bought outright by Coxa and extended his contract until 2020.

On 11 April 2018, Galdezani joined Atlético Mineiro on loan for the remainder of the 2018 season.

On 11 January 2019, Galdezani joined Internacional on a year-long loan, but suffered a knee injury in the day of his presentation and only returned to training in November; he left in December without playing a single match.

Galdezani spent the 2020 playing for his parent club Coritiba, suffering relegation from the top tier. On 19 March 2021, he signed for Bahia also in a temporary deal.

Career statistics

References

External links

1992 births
Living people
Brazilian footballers
Association football midfielders
Campeonato Brasileiro Série A players
Campeonato Brasileiro Série B players
Campeonato Brasileiro Série C players
Paulista Futebol Clube players
Sport Club do Recife players
Esporte Clube Juventude players
Clube de Regatas Brasil players
Coritiba Foot Ball Club players
Clube Atlético Mineiro players
Sport Club Internacional players
Esporte Clube Bahia players
Associação Atlética Internacional (Limeira) players
Avaí FC players